Louis-Jean-Nicolas Monmerqué (6 December 1780 – 27 February 1860) was a 19th-century French magistrate and man of letters.

Biography 
He wrote many biographical notices (Brantôme, (1823) ; Madame de Maintenon, (1828) ; Jean Ier, (1844), in-8°) and mostly editions of ancient documents (memoires and correspondences), including Collection de mémoires relatifs à l’histoire de France, depuis Henri IV jusqu’à la paix de Paris, with Petitot (1819–29, 130 vol. in-8°) ; Lettres de Mme de Sévigné (1818–19, 10 vol. in-8°), edition reworked by Ad. Régnier in the Collection des grands écrivains (1861–67, 11 vol. in-8°) ; Lettres choisies de Mme de Sévigné et de ses amis à l'usage de la jeunesse (1828, Paris, J. J. Blaise, 2 t. in-18°) ;  by Gédéon Tallemant des Réaux (1831, 6 vol. in-8°) ; Théâtre français du moyen âge, du XIe au XIVe (1839, in-8°), etc.

His works earned him his election at the Académie des inscriptions et belles-lettres in 1833.

He was twice married to heiresses of the old nobility. He is buried at Père Lachaise Cemetery (54th division)

Sources 
 Gustave Vapereau, Dictionnaire universel des littératures, Paris, Hachette, 1876, (p. 1424)

External links 
 Louis Jean Nicolas Monmerqué on data.bnf.fr
 Notice of the CTHS mentioning some learned societies to which he belonged. According to Dibdin, he was also a member of the "Société des bibliophiles français".

French magistrates
French bibliographers
Members of the Académie des Inscriptions et Belles-Lettres
Writers from Paris
1780 births
1860 deaths
Burials at Père Lachaise Cemetery
Officiers of the Légion d'honneur